Dahandar-e Mir Amr (also Romanized as Dahandar-e Mīr ʿAmr; also known as Dahandar) is a village in Gafr and Parmon Rural District, Gafr and Parmon District, Bashagard County, Hormozgan Province, Iran. At the 2006 census, its population was 151, in 40 families.

References 

Populated places in Bashagard County